Big Brother 8 is the eighth season of various versions of Big Brother and may refer to:

 Gran Hermano Spain (season 8), the 2006 Spanish edition of Big Brother
 Big Brother 8 (UK), the 2007 UK edition of Big Brother
 Big Brother 8 (U.S.), the 2007 U.S. edition of Big Brother
 Big Brother Germany (season 8), the 2008 German edition of Big Brother
 Big Brother Brasil 8, the 2008 Brazilian edition of Big Brother
 Grande Fratello (season 8), the 2008 Italian edition of Big Brother
 Big Brother Australia 2008, the 2008 Australian edition of Big Brother
 Big Brother 2012 (Finland), the 2012 edition of Big Brother in Finland
 Big Brother Africa 8, the 2013 edition of the African version
 Secret Story 8 (France), the 2014 edition of Big Brother in France
 Bigg Boss 8, the 2014-2015 Indian version of Big Brother in India

See also
 Big Brother (franchise)
 Big Brother (disambiguation)